Peter John Kay (born 2 July 1973) is an English actor, comedy writer and stand-up comedian. He has written, produced and acted in several television and film projects, and has written three books.

Born and brought up in Bolton, Kay studied media performance at the University of Salford. He began working part-time as a stand-up comedian, winning the North West Comedian of the Year award. In 1997 he won Channel 4's So You Think You're Funny contest and the following year was nominated for a Perrier Award for his show at the Edinburgh Fringe Festival. With his public profile raised, in 2000 he co-wrote and starred in That Peter Kay Thing for Channel 4. This resulted in a spin-off sitcom, Peter Kay's Phoenix Nights, which ran for two series from 2001 to 2002 and in turn generated another spin-off, Max and Paddy's Road to Nowhere, in 2004. In 2005 he recorded a promotional video in which he mimed to Tony Christie's 1971 hit "(Is This the Way to) Amarillo", which was reissued to raise money for Comic Relief: the song reached number 1 in the UK Singles Chart, becoming that year's best-selling single in the UK.

In 2008 Kay co-wrote and starred in Britain's Got the Pop Factor... and Possibly a New Celebrity Jesus Christ Soapstar Superstar Strictly on Ice, a parody of several British reality television shows. As the series' fictional protagonist Geraldine McQueen, he released the single "The Winner's Song", which reached number 2 in the UK singles chart. His 2010–2011 stand-up comedy tour was recorded in the Guinness World Records as the most successful ever selling over 1.2 million tickets. He co-wrote and starred in Peter Kay's Car Share, a sitcom screened by the BBC for three series from 2015 to 2018. He also starred in the 2015 BBC sitcom Cradle to Grave.

In 2016 Kay won the BAFTA TV Award for Best Male Comedy Performance, the BAFTA TV Award for Best Scripted Comedy and the National Television Award for Best Comedy for ...Car Share. He also received an honorary doctorate from the University of Salford.

Early life and career
Peter John Kay was born on 2 July 1973 and was brought up in the Farnworth area of Bolton, Lancashire, where he attended Mount Saint Joseph School, leaving with a GCSE in art. His father, Michael, was an engineer who died just before Peter's career took off. His mother, Deirdre (née O'Neill), is an Irish Catholic originally from Coalisland, County Tyrone, and Peter was brought up in her faith. He took several minor jobs, including working in a toilet roll factory, a Netto supermarket, Manchester Arena, a cash and carry, a cinema, a petrol station and a bingo hall, which later inspired episodes for That Peter Kay Thing.

He began a degree course at the University of Liverpool in Drama, Theatre Studies and English Literature.  Struggling with the course, he changed to studying a Higher National Diploma (HND) in media performance (including stand-up) at the University of Salford's Adelphi Campus School of Media, Music and Performance.  In recognition of his contribution to the entertainment industry, Kay received an honorary Doctor of Arts degree from Salford University  on 19 July 2016, at Salford's Lowry Theatre.

Television career

Kay's first TV project was in a 1997 episode of New Voices, a comedy series which showcased rising talent. His episode, "Two Minutes", written by Johanne McAndrew, saw him play a getaway driver as two of his friends attempted to rob a pub of its takings. In 1997, he played a delivery driver in the BBC drama Born to Run.

Also in 1997, he made a one-off appearance on Coronation Street as a delivery driver for Fred Elliott's corner shop.

In 1998, Kay appeared in a series of sketches for Granada TV's "Last Last Show" and "Roy Mills Films of Fun", where he made his TV debut as a character comedy actor and also did a stand-up set. Neil Fitzmaurice also appeared in the series alongside many other local comedians who Kay later recruited for his Channel 4 series.

After presenting a slot entitled "Peter Kay's World of Entertainment" on BBC Two's The Sunday Show, Kay made an episode of Channel 4's Comedy Lab, "The Services", in 1998, which won a Royal Television Society award for best newcomer. This served as a pilot for That Peter Kay Thing.

Following the series' success, Kay and his co-writers – Neil Fitzmaurice and Dave Spikey – used the episode "In the Club" as the basis for Phoenix Nights, which was an immediate hit. Set in a newly refurbished social club run by Brian Potter, the first series was filmed in part at St. Gregory's Social Club in Farnworth, Greater Manchester, where the exterior, hallways and function suite were used.

He appeared in the first episode of the 2002 series of Linda Green, playing a pizza delivery man who ended up being something of a soulmate to the eponymous heroine. He has had two roles in Coronation Street. The first, in the late 1990s, was a brief appearance as a shopfitter, but in January 2004 he co-wrote his scenes, appearing alongside Sally Lindsay; who played Shelley Unwin.

In 2004, Kay followed the success with Max and Paddy's Road to Nowhere, a spin-off of Phoenix Nights. The show featured the bouncer characters from the show—played by Kay and Paddy McGuinness—and at times also featured other characters from Phoenix Nights. Six episodes were made and broadcast from November to December 2004 by Channel 4. In 2005, Kay was awarded a Rose d'Or at the international television festival in Montreux for Best Performance by an Actor.

In 2004, Kay began appearing in a series of television adverts for UK brewery, John Smith's bitter which imitate the style of Phoenix Nights saw Kay develop his catchphrases "'ave it!" and "two lamb bhunas". 

On 17 April 2006, Channel 4 broadcast a "Peter Kay Night", showing out-takes from Phoenix Nights (previously featured on DVD), a behind-the-scenes documentary "180 – A Tour Documentary" which followed Kay behind the scenes of his Mum Wants a Bungalow tour and screened the whole Peter Kay Live in Manchester Arena show.

On 17 June 2006, Kay appeared in the Doctor Who episode "Love & Monsters". His character, the sinister Victor Kennedy, proved to be an alien called the Abzorbaloff in disguise.

In 2008, he returned to television after an absence of four years with the BAFTA-winning satire of reality talent shows, Peter Kay's Britain's Got the Pop Factor... and Possibly a New Celebrity Jesus Christ Soapstar Superstar Strictly on Ice, which he co-wrote with Paul Coleman. The two-hour special was screened on Channel 4 on 17 October 2008.

Kay won his second Royal Television Society award for best actor for playing Geraldine McQueen, a transgender dinner lady from Ireland.

In May 2015 the sitcom Peter Kay's Car Share was aired. The series was a success and a second series was commissioned to start in April 2017. 
In October 2015, he starred in Cradle to Grave another BBC sitcom based on Danny Baker's life as a teenager.

Film career

In 2001 he played Cyril the Barman Kay in Blow Dry, based on the screenplay Never Better by Simon Beaufoy. Kay, who doesn't like travelling outside of Northern England, says he only took the part in Blow Dry because he knew it was going to be filmed in Keighley, Bradford, West Yorkshire. However he was disappointed to learn that his role was being filmed in Shoreditch, Greater London.

Music work

In 2007, Kay followed up the success of "(Is This the Way to) Amarillo" with a cover version of "I'm Gonna Be (500 Miles)", originally by the Proclaimers, also for Comic Relief. In 2009, Kay released "The Official BBC Children in Need Medley", an animation featuring over 100 characters including Thomas the Tank Engine, Bob the Builder and Paddington Bear. It also featured some of the characters' original voice artists including Bernard Cribbins, Neil Morrissey, Ken Barrie and Ringo Starr. The video was premiered on BBC1 on 20 November 2009.

Kay returned his support to Comic Relief in March 2011 with a cover version of "I Know Him So Well", re-recorded by singer Susan Boyle and Kay in the guise of Geraldine McQueen from Britain's Got the Pop Factor. The video which accompanied the single was also directed by Kay and identically parodied the original video shot for shot.

Theatre work
In February 2007, Kay played director Roger DeBris in the Mel Brooks musical The Producers at Manchester's Palace Theatre for 120 shows.

Sporadic appearances and hiatus (2017–2022)

On 9 September 2017, Kay took part in the "We Are Manchester" benefit concert to mark the reopening of Manchester Arena following the terrorist attack in May 2017. He gave a speech to the crowd before introducing the concert's headline act Noel Gallagher's High Flying Birds.

In April 2020, Kay featured in the BBC's Big Night In where he introduced an updated version of "(Is This the Way to) Amarillo". It marked his first television appearance for two years.

On 2 January 2021, Kay was a guest on BBC Radio 2's Saturday morning show, with Cat Deeley hosting this 10am to 1pm programme as Graham Norton had now left the slot.

In August 2021, Kay performed two sold out shows at the Manchester 02 Apollo called 'Doing It for Laura' which took place on Saturday 7 August which had been organised in aid of Laura Nuttall, 20 - who was battling an aggressive brain tumour. The tickets for both shows sold out quickly within 30 minutes.

Return and new tour (2022–present) 
On 6 November 2022, Kay announced a return to stand-up with a tour beginning in December 2022 and ending in July 2025.

Stand-up career

His first stand-up success was in the competition the North West Comedian of the Year, which was held in Manchester and hosted by Dave Spikey, who would later be the co-star and co-writer of Phoenix Nights. Kay was last on the bill and won the competition, beating Johnny Vegas. Kay has said that he sought a career in comedy. However, he continued to work part-time as an usher at his local cinema in Bolton whilst performing stand-up locally. When the cinema closed, he was presented with the choice of finding another job or moving into comedy full-time.

After he entered and won Channel 4's So You Think You're Funny? contest in 1997, his first semi-professional stand-up appearances were at the 1998 Edinburgh Fringe Festival, where he received a prestigious Perrier Award nomination. During this time, he also appeared at various other clubs, such as London's Comedy Store.

Although this led to a certain level of public recognition, it was only after his first live special Live at the Top of the Tower in 2000 that Kay attained mainstream recognition. During this period, he appeared on several chat shows, such as Friday Night with Jonathan Ross and Parkinson, on the latter of which he had previously served as warm-up. It was at this time that production also began on Phoenix Nights.

In November 2009, after an absence of seven years, Kay announced a return to stand-up with four (later extended to 20) dates at the Manchester Arena the following April with a show entitled The Tour That Doesn't Tour Tour...Now On Tour. Demand for tickets caused him to announce soon after that the show would be toured. In January 2012, the tour entered the Guinness Book of World Records as the most successful stand-up comedy tour of all time, playing to a total of 1.2 million people.

Kay's tour received minor criticism in the press when his disabled fans were hit with bills of up to £39 on premium phone lines booking tour tickets. It was later clarified that this was an issue with the ticket booking services associated with specific venues rather than a matter directly associated with Peter Kay or his production company.

Kay was included in the Independent on Sunday's "Happy List" in 2009 as "simply Britain's best comedian", and – as an exception to their general rule – was included again in 2010 for also raising funds for Children in Need.

In November 2017, Kay announced his intention to return to stand-up with his first tour in eight years. Peter Kay Live: Have Gags, Will Travel was scheduled to begin touring in 2018, beginning with the Genting Arena in April before touring at venues such as SSE Hydro, Manchester Arena, The O2 Arena, First Direct Arena, SSE Arena Belfast, Sheffield Arena and Echo Arena Liverpool. On 13 December 2017, Kay announced that he was cancelling all future work projects (including Peter Kay Live: Have Gags Will Travel tour) for family reasons. He had asked that the media respect his and his family's privacy. The tour hit criticism again regarding phone calls as fans were charged 62p per minute to call premium rate phone lines to claim ticket refunds.

On 6 November 2022, via an advert during the series 22 premiere of I'm a Celebrity...Get Me Out of Here!, Kay announced his first stand-up tour in twelve years, running from 2 December 2022 to 11 August 2023. In recognition of the current cost of living crisis, Kay stated that tickets would start at £35, matching the price of his previous 2010 tour. Due to demand, additional dates were announced for 2024 and 2025.

Stand-up tours

DVD releases

In December 2011, it was reported that Kay had sold over 10 million DVDs, a UK record for a comedian and more than the combined sales of best selling films Avatar and Mamma Mia!.

Goodnight Vienna Productions
Kay and his wife Susan are the two directors of Goodnight Vienna Productions, which co-produces Kay's comedy output.

Discography

Albums
2005: The Best of Peter Kay – So Far

Singles

 As Geraldine McQueen.

Filmography

Television

Film

Awards and nominations

References

External links

1973 births
Living people
20th-century English screenwriters
20th-century English comedians
20th-century English male actors
21st-century British screenwriters
21st-century English comedians
21st-century English male actors
Actors from Bolton
Alumni of the University of Salford
Best Male Comedy Performance BAFTA Award (television) winners
British male comedy actors
British male television writers
Comedians from Lancashire
English male comedians
English male film actors
English male television actors
English male voice actors
English male writers
English people of Irish descent
English Roman Catholics
English stand-up comedians
English television directors
English television writers
Male actors from Lancashire
People from Farnworth